George B. Witman is an American biologist currently George F. Booth Chair Professor at University of Massachusetts Medical School and an Elected Fellow of the American Association for the Advancement of Science. His current research is on cilia and flagella biology and has made extensive work involving Chlamydomonas. His highly cited published papers are 1608, 789 and 709.

References

Year of birth missing (living people)
Living people
Fellows of the American Association for the Advancement of Science
University of Massachusetts Medical School faculty
21st-century American biologists